Matilda of Carinthia (Mathilde of Sponheim; died 13 December 1160 or 1161) was a daughter of Engelbert, Duke of Carinthia and his wife Uta of Passau. She married Theobald II, Count of Champagne in 1123.

Her children with Theobald were:
 Henry I, Count of Champagne
 Theobald V, Count of Blois
 Adela of Champagne
 Elizabeth, wife of Roger III, Duke of Apulia and William Gouet IV
 Mary, wife of Odo II, Duke of Burgundy
 William White Hands
 Stephen I of Sancerre
 Agnes, wife of Reginald II, Count of Bar
 Margaret, nun at Fontevrault
 Matilda, wife of Rotrou IV, Count of Perche

References

Sources

Year of birth missing
1160s deaths
12th-century French people
12th-century French women
Countesses of Champagne
Countesses of Chartres
French noble families